Aravete is a small borough in Järva Parish, Järva County, central Estonia. As of 2011 Census, the settlement's population was 769.

Gallery

References

External links
Järva Parish 

Boroughs and small boroughs in Estonia